Not to be confused with the 19th-century illustrator Arthur Murch (illustrator).

Arthur James Murch (8 July 1902, Croydon (Sydney) – 3 September 1989, Avalon (Sydney)) was an Australian artist who won the Archibald Prize in 1949 with a portrait of Bonar Dunlop. Dunlop was a New Zealand artist sculptor and illustrator.

Biography 
Antonio Dattilo-Rubbo introduced him to the French Post-Impressionists, Cézanne and Seurat. His style later became more Cubist. In 1924, he studied with Rayner Hoff at East Sydney Technical College.

Murch spent time training in London at the Chelsea Polytechnic and at Académie Julian, Paris  and visiting Italy after winning the 1925 Society of Artists' Scholarship.

From 1927 to 1930 he worked with artist George Lambert, assisting him with sculptural commissions.

In 1933, he formed part of an Australian expedition into central Australia to Hermannsberg. He later shared his experiences in The Home magazine. In 1936, he exhibited works at the Macquarie Galleries,  created after his second "Centralian" expedition, showing landscapes and portraits of the Pentupui indigenous community. In 1937 Murch became a foundation member of, and exhibited with, Robert Menzies' anti-modernist organisation, the Australian Academy of Art.

He was appointed as an official war artist for six months during the Second World War covering the American and Australia military activities in Australia — 47 works of his are in the Australian War Memorial's collection.

Murch wrote occasionally on art subjects for The Home magazine.

References

External links
http://www.arthurmurch.com
Works by the artist in the collection of the Art Gallery of NSW
Works by the artist in the collection of the National Gallery of Australia
Photo portrait of artist in the collection of the National Portrait Gallery

Archibald Prize winners
1902 births
1989 deaths
Australian portrait painters
World War II artists
Australian war artists
20th-century Australian painters
20th-century Australian male artists
Australian male painters